{{DISPLAYTITLE:C24H44O6}}
The molecular formula C24H44O6 (molar mass: 428.60 g/mol, exact mass: 428.3138 u) may refer to:

 Sorbitan monooleate
 Triheptanoin (Dojolvi)